is a former Korean province, one of the administrative divisions of Korea under Japanese rule, with its capital at Keijō (present day Seoul, South Korea). The province consisted of what is now the South Korean territories of Seoul and Gyeonggi, as well as parts of what is now southern North Korea.

Population

Number of people by nationality according to the 1936 census:

 Overall population: 2,392,296 people
 Japanese: 153,723 people
 Koreans: 2,225,379 people
 Other: 13,194 people

Administrative divisions

The following list is based on the administrative divisions of 1945:

Cities
Keijō (京城府) - (capital) aka Kyeongseong (경성부), present day Seoul.

Jinsen (仁川府): Incheon (인천부). present Incheon Metropolitan City.
Kaijō (開城府): Gaeseong (개성부). present Gaeseong Special City.

Towns and villages 

These are the towns and villages in each district:
 Kōyō (高陽): Goyang (고양). present Goyang City, Mapo District and Eunpyeong District in Seoul Special City.
 Kōshū (廣州): Gwangju, Gyeonggi (광주). present Gwangju City, Seongnam City, Hanam City, Gangnam District, Seocho District, Songpa District and Gangdong District in Seoul Special City.
 Yōshū (楊州): Yangju (양주). present Yangju City, Dongducheon City, Uijeongbu City, Guri City, Namyangju City, Seongbuk District, Gangbuk District, Dobong District, Nowon District, Jungnang District and Gwangjin District in Seoul Special City.
 Rensen (漣川): Yeoncheon (연천).
 Hōsen (抱川): Pocheon (포천).
 Kahei (加平): Gapyeong (가평).
 Yōhei (楊平): Yangpyeong (양평).
 Reishū (驪州): Yeoju (여주).
 Risen (利川): Icheon (이천).
 Ryūjin (龍仁): Yongin (용인).
 Anjō (安城): Anseong (안성).
 Heitaku (平澤): Pyeongtaek (평택).
 Suigen (水原): Suwon (수원). present Suwon City, Osan City and Hwaseong City.
 Shikō (始興): Siheung (시흥). present Siheung City, Gwangmyeong City, Ansan City, Anyang City, Gunpo City, Uiwang City, Gwacheon City, Dongjak District, Gwanak District, Guro District, Geumcheon District in Seoul Special City.
 Fusen (富川): Bucheon (부천). present Bucheon City, Bupyeong District, Namdong District, Yeonsu District in Incheon Metropolitan City, Guro District in Seoul Special City.
 Kinpo (金浦): Gimpo (김포). present Gimpo City, Gyeyang District, Seo District in Incheon Metropolitan City, Yangcheon District and Gangseo District in Seoul Special City.
 Kōka (江華): Ganghwa (강화).
 Hashū (坡州): Paju (파주).
 Chōtan (長湍): Jangdan (장단).
 Kaihō (開豊): Gaepung (개풍). present Gaeseong Special City.

Provincial governors

The following people were provincial ministers before August 1919. This was then changed to the title of governor.

See also
Gyeonggi Province
Provinces of Korea
Governor-General of Chōsen
Administrative divisions of Korea

References

Korea under Japanese rule
Former prefectures of Japan in Korea